Christiane Krajewski (born 4 February 1949) is a German politician (SPD). Krajewski was a finance senator for Berlin and minister in the Saarland.

References

1949 births
Senators of Berlin
Living people